The Boeing EA-18G Growler is an American carrier-based electronic warfare aircraft, a specialized version of the two-seat F/A-18F Super Hornet. The EA-18G replaced the Northrop Grumman EA-6B Prowlers in service with the United States Navy. The Growler's electronic warfare capability is primarily provided by Northrop Grumman. The EA-18G began production in 2007 and entered operational service with the US Navy in late 2009. Australia has also purchased twelve EA-18Gs, which entered service with the Royal Australian Air Force in 2017.

Development

Requirement and testing

On 15 November 2001, Boeing successfully completed an initial flight demonstration of F/A-18F "F-1" fitted with the ALQ-99 electronic warfare system to serve as the EA-18 Airborne Electronic Attack (AEA) concept aircraft. In December 2003, the US Navy awarded a development contract for the EA-18G to Boeing. As primary contractor, Boeing was to construct the forward fuselage and wings, and perform the final assembly. Northrop Grumman was the principal airframe subcontractor and they would supply the center and aft fuselage as well as the principal electronic combat system. In 2003, the Navy expected to receive 90 EA-18Gs.

The first EA-18G test aircraft entered production on 22 October 2004. The first test aircraft, known as EA-1, was rolled out on 3 August 2006, before making its maiden flight at St. Louis on 15 August 2006; it was later ferried to Naval Air Station Patuxent River, Maryland on 22 September 2006. EA-1 primarily supports ground testing in the Air Combat Environment Test and Evaluation Facility (ACETEF) anechoic chamber.

The second aircraft (EA-2) first flew on 10 November 2006, and was delivered to NAS Patuxent River on 29 November 2006. EA-2 is an AEA flight test aircraft, initially flying on Pax River's Atlantic Test Range (ATR) for developmental test of the AEA system before transitioning to the Electronic Combat Range (ECR, or 'Echo Range') in Naval Air Weapons Station China Lake in California. Both aircraft are assigned to VX-23 "Salty Dogs". EA-1 and EA-2 are F/A-18Fs F-134 and F-135, pulled from the St. Louis production line and modified by Boeing to the EA-18G configuration. However, since they were not built initially as Growlers, the Navy has designated these two test aircraft as NEA-18Gs. There were five Growlers flying in the flight test program as of June 2008.

Procurement
In an April 2006 report, the U.S. Government Accountability Office expressed concerns. The GAO felt the electronic warfare systems on the EA-18G were not fully mature so there is a risk of "future cost growth and schedule delays". The report recommended that the DoD consider purchasing additional ICAP III upgrades for EA-6Bs to fill any current and near-term capability gaps and restructure the initial EA-18G production plans so that procurement takes place after the aircraft has "demonstrated full functionality". In a 2008 GAO report, the director of the DoD's Operational Test and Evaluation department questioned the workload on the two-person Growler crew to replace the Prowler's crew of four.

The U.S. Navy has ordered a total of 57 aircraft to replace its in-service EA-6B Prowlers, most of which are based at NAS Whidbey Island. The US DoD gave approval for the EA-18G program to begin low-rate initial production in 2007. The EA-18G was scheduled to finish flight testing in 2008. The Navy planned to buy approximately 85 aircraft in 2008. Approval for full-rate production was expected in the third quarter of 2009, and was given on 23 November 2009. Boeing planned to ramp up production to 20 aircraft per year. On 9 July 2009, General James Cartwright told the United States Senate Committee on Armed Services that the choice had been to continue the F/A-18 production line because the warfighting commanders needed more aerial electronic warfare capability that only the EA-18G could provide.

The Navy's submission for the 2011 defense budget put forth by the Obama Administration calls for four EA-18G Growler squadrons to be added to the fleet. On 14 May 2010, Boeing and the US Department of Defense reached an agreement for a multi-year contract for an additional 66 F/A-18E/Fs and 58 EA-18Gs over the next four years. This will raise the total to 114 EA-18Gs on order.

The Pentagon's Director of Operational Test and Evaluation determined that the EA-18G was "still not operationally suitable" in February 2011. Prime contractor Boeing is working to address issues with software updates. In December 2011, Operational Test and Evaluation concluded that the EA-18G software was "operationally effective and suitable".

On 19 December 2014, the Navy publicly reported that it wants to modify the production contract with Boeing to slow production of the Growler from three airplanes per month to two. It will also purchase an additional 15 Growlers, funded by a spending bill that will go to President Obama for signature in late December 2014. Boeing would then be able to continue running the St. Louis production line through 2017. Boeing has said it cannot sustain the production line at fewer than two airplanes per month.

Design

The Growler's flight performance is similar to that of the F/A-18E/F. This attribute enables the Growler to perform escort jamming as well as the traditional standoff jamming mission (Radar jamming and deception). Growlers are able to accompany F/A-18s during all phases of an attack mission. In order to give the Growler more stable flight for the electronic warfare mission, Boeing changed the leading edge fairings and wing fold hinge fairings, and added wing fences and aileron "tripper strips".

The Growler has more than 90% in common with the standard Super Hornet, sharing airframe, Raytheon AN/APG-79 AESA radar and weapon systems such as the AN/AYK-22 stores management system. Most of the dedicated airborne electronic attack equipment is mounted on a plate in the space that used to house the internal 20 mm cannon and on the wingtips. Nine weapons stations remain free to provide for additional weapons or jamming pods. The added electronics include AN/ALQ-218 wideband receivers on the wingtips and ALQ-99 high and low-band tactical jamming pods. The ALQ-218 combined with the ALQ-99 form a full spectrum electronic warfare suite that is able to provide detection and jamming against all known surface-to-air threats. However, the current pods may be inadequate against emerging threats.

The EA-18G can be fitted with up to five ALQ-99 jamming pods and will typically add two AIM-120 AMRAAM or AGM-88 HARM missiles. The EA-18G will also use the INCANS Interference Cancellation system that will allow voice communication while jamming enemy communications, a capability not available on the EA-6B. In addition to the radar warning and jamming equipment, the Growler possesses a communications receiver and jamming system that will provide suppression and electronic attack against airborne communication threats.

The poor reliability of the ALQ-99 jammer pod and frequent failures of the Built-In Test (BIT) have caused the crew to fly missions with undetected faults.  The ALQ-99 has also interfered with the aircraft's AESA radar and has imposed a high workload on the two-man crew, along with reducing the Growler's top speed.

Boeing is looking into other potential upgrades; the ALQ-99 radar jamming pod may be replaced in the future, and the company is looking into adding weapons and replacing the satellite communications receiver. The Growler is the initial platform for the Next Generation Jammer (NGJ) which uses Active electronically scanned array (AESA) technology to focus jamming power exactly where needed. The NGJ was to be implemented on the F-35. However, in May 2012, the U.S. Navy decided to focus NGJ integration on the EA-18G for an expected in-service date of 2020, and defer work for the F-35. Boeing is also looking at exporting a Growler Lite configuration without the jamming pods for electronic awareness rather than electronic attack.

Three Growlers networked together can generate targeting tracks for hostile radio-frequency sources in real time, but this is difficult to arrange with the current minimum strength US Navy squadrons. Utilizing faster data-links, the Growler could use its EW pods to accurately locate signal sources. In a group of three planes, when one detects a signal from a source such as a cell phone, the other two can also listen for the same signal, all three measuring the amount of time taken for transmissions to travel from the source to each aircraft to trilaterate the location to "a very, very small area." By early 2015, the Navy had demonstrated this concept using EA-18s equipped with Rockwell Collins' tactical targeting network technology (TTNT) and ALQ-218 receivers to acquire emissions from a target vessel and target it from a stand-off range without using their own detectable radar emissions. Boeing announced on 1 December 2015 that they would upgrade Navy EA-18Gs with the TTNT datalink.

Following U.S. Navy missions in Operation Odyssey Dawn during the 2011 Libyan Revolution, the Royal Australian Air Force decided to add the Raytheon ATFLIR (forward looking infrared) pod to their order of 12 Growler aircraft.  When Navy EA-18Gs' radar and radar detectors located possible targets, they passed the information through datalinks to strike fighters.  However, the Growlers themselves lacked the ability to visually confirm what it detected, so adding a FLIR pod gives it visual acuity to see targets and shorten the kill chain; it is not known if the U.S. Navy will also add a FLIR pod.  Australian EA-18Gs will also be equipped with the AIM-9X Sidewinder missile.

Operational history

United States

The first Growler for fleet use was officially accepted by VAQ-129 "Vikings" at NAS Whidbey Island, on 3 June 2008. The Navy planned to buy approximately 85 aircraft to equip 11 squadrons as of 2008. The EA-18G completed operational evaluation in late July 2009. The Growler was rated operationally effective and suitable for operational use.

The first deployable EA-18G squadron was VAQ-132 "Scorpions", which reached operational status in October 2009. The first Growler operational deployment was announced on 17 February 2011. In service, the EA-18's radio name during flight operations will be "Grizzly". The "Growler" nickname sounded too much like the EA-6B's "Prowler" name, so "Grizzly" will be used to avoid confusion. By May 2011, 48 Growlers had been delivered to the U.S. Navy.

With the termination of the EB-52H standoff jammer, the Growler became the sole remaining manned tactical jammer. Air Staff requirements director Maj. Gen. David Scott has indicated that the USAF will seek to provide electronic warfare officers to fly on U.S. Navy Growlers, without providing funding to purchase additional aircraft. U.S. Air Force personnel of 390th Electronic Combat Squadron stationed at NAS Whidbey Island have been supporting and flying the Growler.

The EA-18G was first used in combat during Operation Odyssey Dawn, enforcing the UN no-fly zone over Libya in 2011. Five EA-18Gs were redeployed from Iraq to support operations in Libya in 2011.

Australia
In 2008, the Australian Government requested export approval from the US government to purchase up to six EA-18Gs, which would be part of the order for 24 F/A-18F Super Hornets.

On 27 February 2009, Defence Minister Joel Fitzgibbon announced that 12 of the 24 Super Hornets on order would be wired on the production line for future fit-out as EA-18Gs. The additional wiring would cost A$35 million. On 23 August 2012, the Australian Government announced that 12 RAAF Super Hornets would be fitted with Growler capability at a cost of $1.5 billion, making the Royal Australian Air Force the only military other than the U.S. to operate the Growler's electronic jamming equipment.

On 3 May 2013, the Australian Government announced that it will buy 12 new-build Growlers to supplement the existing Super Hornet fleet. Australia took delivery of the first of 12 Growlers on 29 July 2015. Uniquely, Australian Growlers will be equipped with the AN/ASQ-228 ATFLIR targeting pod and will also have additional air-to-air weapons in the form of the AIM-9X missile. The aircraft will be operated by No. 6 Squadron RAAF. On 7 July 2017, the RAAF completed delivery of the 12 EA-18G Growlers with the arrival of the last Growler at RAAF Base Amberley, home of No. 6 Squadron RAAF.

One of the Australian EA-18Gs was written off following an engine fire in January 2018, leaving the force with 11 of the type. On 29 January, an Australian EA-18G caught fire after an aborted takeoff at Nellis Air Force Base, Nevada while participating in Exercise Red Flag 2018. The crew were able to exit the jet on the ground unharmed. An investigation found that one engine's high-pressure compressor had broken into three major pieces that severely damaged the lower airframe, right tailfin, and the other engine. The aircraft was written off on 15 August and the Australian Government is attempting to claim compensation for the loss of the A$125 million aircraft.

On 9 December 2020, the Royal Australian Air Force had announced that the 11 EA-18G Growlers and 24 F/A-18F Super Hornets had been grounded after an incident occurred where the crew of a RAAF F/A-18F had to eject on takeoff which is under investigation.

On 30 September 2021, the US State Department approved the sale of an EA-18G to Australia to replace that lost in the 2018 accident. This aircraft was ordered in early 2022, with the price being up to $US 125 million. It will be acquired from the US Navy's stock of Growlers and be modified to the same configuration as the other Australian aircraft before being delivered to the RAAF.

Operators

 Royal Australian Air Force
 No. 6 Squadron RAAF

 United States Air Force
390th Electronic Combat Squadron provides training for electronic warfare officers for Navy units by augmenting VAQ-129 with some USAF instructors.
United States Navy
VAQ-129
VAQ-130
VAQ-131
VAQ-132
VAQ-133
VAQ-134
VAQ-135
VAQ-136
VAQ-137
VAQ-138
VAQ-139
VAQ-140
VAQ-141
VAQ-142
VAQ-144
VAQ-209
VX-9
VX-23
VX-31
Naval Strike and Air Warfare Center

Specifications (EA-18G Growler)

See also

References

Notes

Bibliography

External links 

 
EA-18G profile at GlobalSecurity.org
EA-18G Program: The USA's Electronic Growler at DefenseIndustryDaily.com
"EA-18G "Growler": New platform and capabilities set to un-level the SEAD playing field". Flight International, 8 July 2008.
"When Hornets Growl". Air & Space, 1 March 2011.
VAQ-141 Shadowhawks EA-18G Growler: Photo walk around of two aircraft including the CAG bird.
2013-2019 US Navy Environmental Impact Study into EA-18G Growler Flight Operations at NAS Whidbey Island

Carrier-based aircraft
2000s United States attack aircraft
Twinjets
Mid-wing aircraft
Aircraft first flown in 2006